Moprolol is a beta-adrenergic antagonist,  or beta blocker.

See also
 Levomoprolol, the (S)-enantiomer of moprolol

Beta blockers
N-isopropyl-phenoxypropanolamines
Catechol ethers